This is a list of football (soccer) clubs in Chile.

Primera División de Chile 2017
 Audax Italiano
 Colo-Colo
 Curicó Unido
 Deportes Antofagasta
 Deportes Iquique
 Deportes Temuco
 Everton
 Huachipato
 O'Higgins
 Palestino
 San Luis
 Santiago Wanderers
 Unión Española
 Universidad Católica
 Universidad de Chile
 Universidad de Concepción

Primera B de Chile 2017
 Barnechea
 Cobreloa
 Cobresal
 Coquimbo Unido
 Deportes Copiapó
 Deportes La Serena
 Deportes Puerto Montt
 Deportes Valdivia
 Iberia
 Magallanes
 Ñublense
 Rangers
 San Marcos de Arica
 Santiago Morning
 Unión La Calera
 Unión San Felipe

Segunda División de Chile 2017
 Colchagua C.D.
 Deportes Melipilla
 Deportes Pintana
 Deportes Recoleta
 Deportes Santa Cruz
 Deportes Vallenar
 Independiente de Cauquenes
 Malleco Unido
 Naval
 Provincial Osorno
 San Antonio Unido

Tercera División de Chile 2017
 A.C. Colina
 Chimbarongo F.C.
 Deportes Limache
 Deportes Rengo
 Deportivo Estación Central
 Fernández Vial
 Gasparín F.C.
 General Velásquez
 Lautaro de Buin
 Deportes Linares
 Municipal Mejillones
 Municipal Salamanca
 Provincial Ovalle
 Real San Joaquín
 Tomás Greig F.C.

Tercera B de Chile 2017
 Academia Fútbol Joven
 Brisas del Maipo
 Buenos Aires de Parral
 Campos de Batalla
 Cultural Maipú
 Curacaví F.C.
 Deportivo La Granja
 Deportes Pirque
 Deportes Tomé
 Deportivo Hirmas
 Enfoque de Rancagua
 Escuela de Fútbol Macul
 Ferro Lampa
 Ferroviarios
 Jireh F.C.
 Juventud Puente Alto
 Juventud Salvador
 Luis Matte Larraín
 Lota Schwager
 Municipal Lampa
 Municipal Ovalle
 Municipal Quilicura
 Municipal Santiago
 Provincial Marga Marga
 Provincial Talagante
 Pudahuel Barrancas
 Quintero Unido
 Real Maipú
 San Bernardo Unido
 Trasandino
 Unión Casablanca
 Unión Compañias

Other clubs
   Academia Machalí
   Academia Quilpué
   Academia Samuel Reyes
   Andarivel
   Antártida Chilena
   Arrieta Guindos
   Arsenal (Recoleta)
   Arturo Prat
   Atlético Caupolicán (Rengo)
   Atlético Curacaví
   Atlético Molina
   Badminton
   Cabildo AGC
   Carlos Walker
   Carozzi
   CF Rapa Nui
   CF San Pedro de Atacama
   Chilectra
   Chiprodal
   Comercio de Llay Llay
   Con Con National
   Constitución Unido
   Corporación Ñuñoa
   Cristo Salva
   C.T.C.
   C.T.I.
   Cultural Doñihue
   Defensor Casablanca
   Deportes Aviación
   Deportes Brasil
   Deportes Cerro Navia
   Deportes Colina
   Deportes Coronel
   Deportes Gasco
   Deportes Good Year
   Deportes Laja
   Deportes La Ligua
   Deportes La Unión
   Deportes Las Ánimas
   Deportes Maipo
   Deportes Polpaico
   Deportes San Bernardo
   Deportes Talcahuano
   Deportes Tocopilla
   Deportes Victoria
   Deportivo Alemán
   Deportivo Arauco
   Deportivo Arellano
   Deportivo Luis Musrri
   Deportivo Ormazábal
   Deportivo Peumo
   Deportivo Purranque
   Deportivo Teno
   Estrella de Chile
   Estudiantes de Quilpué
   Ferrobadminton
   Fundición Chagres
   Graneros Unido
   Green Cross
   Hosanna
   Instituto Nacional
   Iván Mayo
   Juventud Chépica
   Juventud Ferro (Chimbarongo)
   Juventud O'Higgins (Curacaví)
   Juventud Padre Hurtado
   Lan Chile
   Los Cóndores (Colbún)
   Lozapenco
   Magallanes de Nancagua
   Malloco Atlético
   Manuela Figueroa
   Metropolitano F.C.
   Morning Star
   Mulchén Unido
   Municipal Alto Hospicio
   Municipal Las Condes
   Municipal Limache
   Municipal Nogales Melón
   Municipal Pozo Almonte
   Municipal San Pedro de la Paz
   Orilla de Martínez
   Peñalolén
   Provincial Temuco
   Rayo del Pacífico (Algarrobo)
   Real León
   Regional Atacama
   Santa Fe
   Santiago F.C.
   Santiago National
   Santiago National Juventus
   Soinca Bata
   Sportivo Cartagena
   Sportverein Jugendland
   Súper Lo Miranda
   Talca National
   Thomas Bata
   Tricolor Municipal
   Unión Bellavista
   Unión Coquimbo
   Unión Deportiva Española Temuco
   Union Deportivo Ferroviarios (Victoria)
   Unión Molina
   Unión Quilpué
   Unión San Sebastián
   Unión San Vicente
   Unión Santa María
   Union Flor Star
   Unión Veterana
   Universidad Arturo Prat
   Universidad Iberoamericana
   Universidad de Tarapacá
   Valle del Elqui (Vicuña)
   Vicuña Elqui

See also
Liga Chilena de Fútbol: Primera División
Liga Chilena de Fútbol: Primera B
Liga Chilena de Fútbol: Segunda División
Liga Chilena de Fútbol: Tercera División
Liga Chilena de Fútbol: Tercera B

Chile
clubs
 
Football clubs